The 6.5-284 Norma originated as a wildcat cartridge based on the .284 Winchester cartridge necked down to 6.5 mm.

History 
The  parent case .284 Winchester was created around 1963, but did not see extensive commercial use.   The 6.5 caliber allowed for the use of long, aerodynamic bullets.  In 1999, Norma submitted it to CIP.  It has since been standardized as the 6.5mm-284 Norma.

Use 
The 6.5-284 has been used extensively in benchrest competitions and is known as an extremely accurate long range round. Using an improved version of the 6.5-284, Rich DeSimone set a  world record with a  group. Rich DeSimone's  record has been broken by Tom Sarver, who shot a  group in 2007 using a .300 Hulk wildcat cartridge that is based on the .338 Lapua Magnum cartridge.

See also
List of rifle cartridges
6.5x55 Swedish
.260 Remington
6.5x47 Lapua
6.5 Creedmoor
6.5 WSSM

References

External links
 Wildcatting the .284 Winchester Long-range shooters and wildcatters have kept the .284 alive. By M.L. McPherson
Why the 6.5x284 for Long Range Shooting? by Robert Whitley, Precision Shooting Magazine, April 2007, Vol 54
The 6.5mm-284 Norma and 6.5mm Remington Magnum by Chuck Hawks
 Cartridge of the Month

Pistol and rifle cartridges
Wildcat cartridges